Pushkinsky (masculine), Pushkinskaya (feminine), or Pushkinskoye (neuter) may refer to:
Pushkinsky District, name of several districts in Russia
Pushkinsky (rural locality) (Pushkinskaya, Pushkinskoye), name of several rural localities in Russia
Pushkinsky Bridge, name of one demolished and three existing bridges across the Moskva River, Russia; see Andreyevsky Bridge
Pushkinskaya (Moscow Metro), a station of the Moscow Metro, Russia
Pushkinskaya (Saint Petersburg Metro), a station of the Saint Petersburg Metro, Russia
Pushkinskaya (Minsk Metro), a station of the Minsk Metro, Belarus
Pushkinskaya Square, a square in Moscow, Russia